Hassanzadeh is a surname. Notable people with the surname include:

Ahmad Hassanzadeh (born 1985), Iranian footballer
Ali Asghar Hassanzadeh (born 1987), Iranian futsal player
Khosrow Hassanzadeh (born 1963), Iranian painter
Mohammad Hassanzadeh (born 1990), Iranian basketball player
Reza Hassanzadeh (disambiguation), multiple Iranian footballers